Echinogorgia is a genus of corals belonging to the family Plexauridae.

The species of this genus are found in Pacific and Indian Ocean.

Species
 

Species:

Echinogorgia abietina 
Echinogorgia armata 
Echinogorgia aurantiaca

References

Plexauridae
Octocorallia genera